The Green River Generating Station was a coal-fired power plant owned and operated by Kentucky Utilities, which was removed from service on 30 September 2015.  It was located in Muhlenberg County, Kentucky.

Emissions data
2006  Emissions: 1,169,616 tons 
2006  Emissions: 
2006  Emissions:  
2005 Mercury Emissions:

See also

Coal mining in Kentucky

References

External links
 Official Website

Energy infrastructure completed in 1954
Buildings and structures in Muhlenberg County, Kentucky